August Strindberg's Little Catechism for the Underclass (Swedish: August Strindbergs lilla katekes för underklassen) is a catechism written by August Strindberg.

External links 

 August Strindbergs Lilla katekes för Underklassen (In Swedish) - online

References 

 August strindbergs lilla katerkes för underklassen, Karneval förlag
 Bohman. Förord till August Strindbergs lilla katekes för underklassen, Karneval förlag, andra tryckningen

August Strindberg
Swedish literature
Critique of political economy